Alexander Alexandrovich Ivanov (December 9, 1936 —  June 12, 1996) was a Soviet and Russian teacher, poet-parodist, permanent host of the cult TV show  in the Soviet Union (1978-1991).

Biography
Ivanov was born in Moscow into an artist's family.

In 1960 he graduated from the Faculty of Drawing  of the Sholokhov Moscow State University for Humanities. He worked as a teacher of drawing and descriptive geometry.

In 1962, his creative career began.  Ivanov owns a number of articles, pamphlets, notes. In 1970 he was admitted to the Union of Soviet Writers.

In 1993 he signed the Letter of Forty-Two.

Filmography
 The Secret of the Iron Door  (1970) as traffic policeman
 A Rogue's Saga  (1984) as cameo
 Two Arrows. Stone Age Detective  (1989) as Gaunt

References

External links
 
 Эпиграммы Александра Иванова

1936 births
1996 deaths
20th-century Russian male actors
Soviet male film actors
Soviet male poets
Russian male poets
Russian parodists
Soviet television presenters
Russian humorists
Russian lyricists
Russian-language poets
Moscow State Pedagogical University alumni
Burials at Vvedenskoye Cemetery